The Treaty of Accession 1994 was the agreement between the member states of the European Union and four countries (Norway, Austria, Finland and Sweden), concerning these countries' accession into the EU. It entered into force on 1 January 1995. The Treaty arranged accession of Austria, Finland and Sweden to the EU and amended earlier Treaties of the European Union. As such it is an integral part of the constitutional basis of the European Union. Norway failed to join the EU because its referendum did not pass.

Full title
The full official name of the treaty is:

Referendums
  Austrian referendum
  Finnish referendum
  Åland referendum
  Norwegian referendum
  Swedish referendum

See also
1995 enlargement of the European Union
Norway–European Union relations

References 

1994 in the European Union
Treaties of Accession to the European Union
Treaties entered into force in 1995
Treaties concluded in 1994
Treaties of Finland
Treaties of Sweden
Treaties of Norway
Treaties of Austria
1994 in Austria
1994 in Sweden
1994 in Finland
Treaties extended to Åland